Libertarians have differing opinions on the validity of intellectual property.

Political parties 
The Libertarian Party of Canada takes "a moderate approach to patents and copyrights", calling for "a careful review of existing and proposed legislation".

The Libertarian Party of Russia writes in its platform that "intellectual property" is a privilege granted by the state. Accordingly, "intellectual property rights" are enforced by the state through violence. On this basis, LPR writes in its programme that it intends to repeal the section of the Civil Code of Russia, as well as the articles of the Code of the Russian Federation on Administrative Offenses and Criminal Code of Russia that provide for sanctions for infringement of "intellectual property rights".

Right-libertarian views 
Anarcho-capitalists oppose the existence of even a minimal state. This ideological framework requires that any functions served by intellectual property law promulgation and enforcement be provided through private sector institutions.

Murray Rothbard argues for allowing contractually arising infinite copyright terms and against the need for any government role in protecting intellectual property. Rothbard states that government's involvement in defining arbitrary limits on the duration, scope and so on of intellectual property in order to "promote the Progress of Science and useful Arts" is inherently problematic, saying: "By what standard do you judge that research expenditures are 'too much,' 'too little,' or just about enough?". Thus, he argues that intellectual property laws can actually hinder innovation since competitors can be indefinitely discouraged from further research expenditures in the general area covered by the patent because the courts may hold their improvements as infringements on the previous patent and the patent holder is discouraged from engaging in further research in this field because the privilege discourages his improvement of his invention for the entire period of the patent, with the assurance that no competitor can trespass on his domain.

Morris and Linda Tannehill propose that ideas in the form of inventions could be registered in a privately owned "data bank". The inventor could then buy insurance against the theft and unauthorized commercial use of the invention and the insurance company would guarantee to not only compensate the inventor for any losses suffered due to such infringement but to stop such unauthorized use.

Opponents to intellectual property rights include Wendy McElroy, Tom G. Palmer, Henri Lepage, Boudewijn Bouckaert, Jeffrey Tucker and Stephan Kinsella. Kinsella points out in Against Intellectual Property that patents may be inefficient since they divert resources from research and development to patent filing and lawsuits. He notices that theoretical research can not be patented as easily as practical research and thus theoretical research is relatively underfunded. Moreover, he argues that property rights can only apply to resources that are scarce, which intellectual property is not. Kinsella also claims that the only way that intellectual property rights can be implemented is by limiting others' physical property rights.

David D. Friedman takes a neutral stance on intellectual property, claiming "there are good arguments on both sides of that question".

Ayn Rand's Views 
Ayn Rand, founder of Objectivism, supported copyrights and patents, noting in Capitalism: The Unknown Ideal:

Rand held that patent should be granted for limited terms only:

Left-libertarian views 
Roderick T. Long argues that the concept of intellectual property is not libertarian. He holds that prohibiting people from using, reproducing and trading copyrighted material is an infringement of freedom of speech and freedom of the press and that since information exists in people's minds and other people's property one cannot own information without owning other people. Claiming that authors and publishers will continue to produce absent copyright protection, he cites the fact that hundreds of thousands of articles are uploaded onto the Internet by their authors every day, available to anyone in the world for free and that nearly all works written before the 20th century are in the public domain, yet pre-1900 works are still published and sold.

Benjamin Tucker, opposing intellectual property, writes that "the patent monopoly consists in protecting inventors against competition for a period long enough to extort from the people a reward enormously in excess of the labor measure of their services,in other words, in giving certain people a right of property for a term of years in laws and facts of Nature, and the power to exact tribute from others for the use of this natural wealth, which should be open to all".

Other libertarian and anarchist views 
Anarchists such as Lysander Spooner and J. Neil Schulman have also argued for forms of intellectual property.

See also

 Copyright Term Extension Act (CTEA)

References 

Intellectual property law
Intellectual property
Intellectual property activism
Economics of intellectual property